Chrysozephyrus vittata, the Tytler's hairstreak, is a small butterfly found in India that belongs to the lycaenids or blues family.

Taxonomy
The butterfly was previously classified as Thecla vittata Tytler.

Range
The butterfly occurs in India in Assam, Manipur and Nagaland, and beyond in Laos, northern Vietnam and western China

See also
List of butterflies of India (Lycaenidae)

Cited references

References
  
 
 

Chrysozephyrus
Butterflies of Asia